Major General M. A. Matin is a Bangladeshi military official and politician. He was elected as MP of Magura-1 in Third General Election of Bangladesh and Fourth General Election of Bangladesh.

References

People from Magura District
3rd Jatiya Sangsad members
Bengali politicians
4th Jatiya Sangsad members
Bangladesh Army generals
Possibly living people
Year of birth missing